The Monogaga Classified Forest is found in the Sassandra and San-Pédro Departments of Côte d'Ivoire, and covers 350 km. Parts of the forest are managed as protected areas where all exploitation is banned, whereas farmers are allowed to grow crops in other parts.

Mammals
The classified forest of Monogaga might still hold a chimpanzee population of over 100 individuals.

References

Protected areas of Ivory Coast